is a generic name for a type of Shinto kami popularly worshipped in Kantō and neighboring areas in Japan where, as tutelary deities of borders and paths, they are believed to protect travellers, pilgrims, villages, and individuals in "transitional stages" from epidemics and evil spirits. Dōsojin are often represented as a human couple, carved male or female genitals, large stones or statues, or even tall poles along a road.

Dōsojin are sometimes housed in small roadside Shinto shrines called hokora. In rural areas Dōsojin can be found at village boundaries, in mountain passes, or along byways, and in urban areas they can be seen at street corners or near bridges. When shaped like a phallus, they are associated with birth, procreation, and marital harmony. When represented as a human couple, Dōsojin are revered as deities of marriage and fertility.

History 
The origin of Dōsojin stone markers is uncertain and has no exact date. It is known, however, that after Buddhism was introduced, Jizō became a tutelary god of travelers and pilgrims.

Important dōsojin

Sae no Kami
In modern times, Dōsojin have become fused in popular belief with a different deity having similar characteristics called "Sae no kami", whose birth is described in the Kojiki. When one of the kami, Izanagi-no-mikoto, sought to leave after going to the realm of the dead (Yomi no Kuni) to visit his spouse Izanami-no-mikoto, he was chased by the demoness . To stop her, he threw her a stick from which Sae no Kami was born. For this reason, he is the kami who prevents the passage of the spirits of the dead into the world of the living, and therefore a god who is a protector of boundaries. He is represented by large rocks set at the edges of villages. Because of the rocks' elongated shape, he came to be associated also with childbirth, children and matrimonial happiness. As a consequence, he was in turn associated also with Jizō, the bodhisattva who is the protector of children.

Jizō
Jizō is the Japanese version of Bodhisattva Ksitigarbha, a Buddhist bodhisattva worshiped mainly in East Asia. His assimilation within a group of kami is an example of the Japanese syncretism of Buddhism and Shinto (shinbutsu shūgō). Originally from India, in Japan he was given new attributes and has become the guardian of children, expecting mothers, firemen, travelers, pilgrims, and unborn, aborted, or miscarried children. Statues of Jizō can be found along mountain passes or harrowing roads in Japan, often dressed in red, sometimes white, caps and bibs by distressed parents. Small stones are frequently piled in front of a Jizō statue, a tradition believed to relieve a child of their penance.

Jizō statues commonly appear in groupings of six, called Roku Jizō. Six because of Jizō's vow to exist concurrently at all six states of Karmic Rebirth. A Roku Jizō appears in the Japanese folktale Kasa Jizō.

Chimata no Kami
, according to the  Kojiki, was born when kami Izanagi threw away his trousers to wash himself after returning from Yomi, the land of the dead. The Nihongi and Kogoshūi tell the same myth, but call the kami Sarutahiko. Chimata-no-kami symbols can be found at crossroads, perhaps because of the deity being associating with joining, and some famous onsens, to cure sexual or fertility issues.

Batō Kannon 
Batō Kannon is the bodhisattva of compassion and keeps a watchful eye over the animal state of Karmic Rebirth. Atop Batō Kannon's head rests a horse's head. Stone statues of this deity can be found beside perilous paths and byways, like Jizō statues, in northern Japan. However, Dosojin in Batō Kannon's form not only protect travelers, but their horses as well.

Worship 
Every January 15 in the village of Nozawaonsen, Nagano the Dosojin Matsuri is held. The Dosojin Matsuri is a fire festival meant to celebrate the birth of a family's first child, exorcise yōkai, and ensure blissful marriages. The day prior to the Dosojin Matsuri, a hundred or so residents of Nozawaonsen construct a shaden. Meanwhile, across the glade are two wooden poles that represent a human couple, the village's version of Dōsojin. On the day of the festival the shaden is burned in a scuffle between men ages twenty-five and forty-two—considered unlucky ages for men in Japan—and the rest of the villagers who bear reed torches. As the shaden burns, the village men of forty-two years sing to the Dōsojin. The men ages twenty-five and forty-two play a key role in the festival to attain the protection of the Dōsojin, so that the misfortune brought about by their ages will be nullified.

See also
 A-un
 Castor and Pollux
 Gate deities of the underworld
 Glossary of Shinto
 Hecate
 Hermes/Mercury
 Janus
 Kṣitigarbha
 Liminal deity
 Lugal-irra and Meslamta-ea
 Menshen
 Nio
 Ox-Head and Horse-Face
 Pan
 Terminus

References

External links
 

Japanese folk religion
Shinto in Japan
Shinbutsu shūgō
Liminal deities
Kṣitigarbha
Tutelary deities